Devin Taylor may refer to:

 Devin Taylor (American football) (born 1989), American football defensive end
 Devin Taylor (wrestler) (born 1988), American model, actress, television personality, and professional wrestler